Artur Prokop (born December 18, 1972) is a Polish footballer who last played for LKS Nieciecza. He previously played in the Ekstraklasa for Hutnik Kraków, RKS Radomsko and Górnik Zabrze.

External links 
 

1972 births
Living people
Polish footballers
Hutnik Nowa Huta players
RKS Radomsko players
Podbeskidzie Bielsko-Biała players
Górnik Zabrze players
Kolejarz Stróże players
Bruk-Bet Termalica Nieciecza players
Sportspeople from Tarnów
Association football midfielders
Unia Tarnów players